French basketball clubs in European and worldwide competitions is the record of professional men's basketball clubs from France's top-tier level league, the LNB Pro A, in international competitions.

The finals

French clubs in EuroLeague (1st tier)

Season to season

French clubs in FIBA Saporta Cup (2nd tier)

Season to season

French clubs in FIBA Korać Cup (3rd tier)

Season to season

See also
European basketball clubs in European and worldwide competitions from:
 Croatia
 Czechoslovakia
 Greece
 Israel
 Italy
 Russia
 Spain
 Turkey
 USSR
 Yugoslavia

References 

Basketball in France